Christopher Street is a street in the West Village neighborhood of the New York City borough of Manhattan. It is the continuation of 9th Street west of Sixth Avenue.

It is most notable for the Stonewall Inn, which is located on Christopher Street near the corner of Seventh Avenue South. As a result of the Stonewall riots in 1969, the street became the epicenter of the world’s gay rights movement in the late 1970s. To this day, the inn and the street serve as an international symbol of gay pride.

Christopher Street is named after Charles Christopher Amos, the owner of the inherited estate which included the location of the street. Amos is also the namesake of nearby Charles Street, and of the former Amos Street, which is now West 10th Street.

History

Christopher Street is, technically, the oldest street in the West Village, as it ran along the south boundary of Admiral Sir Peter Warren's estate, which abutted the old Greenwich Road (now Greenwich Avenue) to the east and extended north to the next landing on the North River, at present-day Gansevoort Street. The street was briefly called Skinner Road after Colonel William Skinner, Sir Peter's son-in-law. The street received its current name in 1799, when the Warren land was acquired by Warren's eventual heir, Charles Christopher Amos. Charles Street remains, but Amos Street is now 10th Street.

The road ran past the churchyard wall of the Church of St. Luke in the Fields (built 1820–22; rebuilt after a fire, 1981–85) still standing on its left, down to the ferry landing, commemorated in the block-long Weehawken Street (laid out in 1829), the shortest street in the West Village. At the Hudson River, with its foundation in the river and extending north to 10th Street, Newgate Prison, the first New York State Prison, occupied the site from 1796 to 1829, when the institution was removed to Sing Sing and the City plotted and sold the land.

West Street is on more recently filled land, but the procession of boats that had made the inaugural pass through the Erie Canal stopped at the ferry dock at the foot of Christopher Street, November 4, 1825, where it was met by a delegation from the city; together they proceeded to the Lower Bay, where the cask of water brought from the Great Lakes was ceremoniously emptied into the salt water.

In 1961, Jane Jacobs, resident in the area and author of The Death and Life of Great American Cities published that same year, headed a group that successfully stopped Mayor Robert Wagner's plan to demolish twelve blocks along West Street north of Christopher Street, including the north side of Christopher Street to Hudson Street, and an additional two blocks south of it, slated for "urban renewal".

Gay icon

In the 1970s, Christopher Street became the "Main Street" of gay New York. Large numbers of gay men would stroll its length at seemingly all hours. Gay bars and stores selling leather fetish clothing and artistic decorative items flourished at that time. This changed dramatically with the loss of many gay men during the AIDS epidemic in the 1980s. 

Christopher Street is the site of the Stonewall Inn, the bar whose patrons fought back violently in June 1969 against a police raid, sparking the Stonewall riots that are widely seen as the birth of the gay liberation movement. The Christopher Street Liberation Day Committee formed to commemorate the first anniversary of that event, the beginning of the international tradition of a late-June event to celebrate gay pride. The annual gay pride festivals in Berlin, Cologne, and other German cities are known as Christopher Street Days or "CSD".

Christopher Street magazine, a respected gay magazine, began publication in July 1976 and folded in December 1995.

Anaïs Nin once worked at Lawrence R. Maxwell Books, located at 45 Christopher Street.

Iconic locations
Near Sixth Avenue, Christopher Street intersects with a short, winding street, coincidentally named Gay Street.

Since 1992, Christopher Park, located at the intersection of Christopher, Grove, and West 4th Streets, has hosted a duplicate of the sculpture Gay Liberation Monument by George Segal to commemorate the gay rights traditions of the area.

The Oscar Wilde Bookshop, located on the corner of Christopher and Gay, was the oldest LGBT bookshop in the world until it closed in 2009.

Other locations 

 McNulty's Tea and Coffee Company, a purveyor dating back to 1895, is on the street.
 Kettle of Fish, a bar now on Christopher Street, was once located above the famous Gaslight Cafe on MacDougal Street. Since the Beat Generation, it has also become affiliated with Green Bay Packers fans.
 Adjacent to Sheridan Square is Christopher Park, a .145 acre landmark. The park that contains a bronze statue of Philip Sheridan and a reproduction of George Segal's Gay Liberation, originally located at Stanford University.
 St John's Lutheran Church is at 81 Christopher Street, between Bleecker and West 4th Streets.
 The Lucille Lortel Theatre, an Off-Broadway playhouse, is located at 121 Christopher Street.
 At the westernmost tip is the Christopher Street Pier, which was recently renovated and converted into a waterfront park.
 Christopher Street is the first stop in Manhattan on the 33rd Street branches of the PATH. The PATH identifies Christopher Street station with a large single capital 'C'.
 The street also hosts a station on the New York City Subway's IRT Broadway–Seventh Avenue Line at Christopher Street – Sheridan Square, Formerly, the Christopher Street elevated station served the now-demolished IRT Ninth Avenue Line.
 At the southwest corner of Seventh Avenue and Christopher Street is the Hess triangle, a mosaic which reads "Property of the Hess Estate Which Has Never Been Dedicated for Public Purpose".  A surveying error for the subway line left this small triangle remaining in private  possession.

Notable current and past residents

Theodor W. Adorno, philosopher and cultural theorist, once lived at 45 Christopher Street
Richard Amos, brother of Charles Christopher Amos, member of the Culper Spy Ring in New York City during the American Revolutionary War
Eva Amurri, actor
Bob Balaban, actor and writer, lived at 95 Christopher Street
Vincent Canadé, artist, lived at 86 Christopher Street in the 1930s
James Coco, actor, once lived at 45 Christopher Street
E. E. Cummings, poet, lived at 11 Christopher Street in 1918
Harlan Ellison, science fiction author, lived at 95 Christopher Street in the early 1960s
Dick Francis, science fiction illustrator, once lived at 105 Christopher Street
Ben M. Hall, author and founder of the Theatre Historical Society of America, lived at 181 Christopher Street where he was murdered in 1970
Rosemary Harris, actress, once lived at 77 Christopher Street
Philip Seymour Hoffman, actor
Sally Kirkland, actress, once lived at 84 Christopher Street
Luigi Lucioni, Italian-American painter known for his still lifes, landscapes, and portraits. His family emigrated to Christopher Street from Malnate, Italy in 1911.
Peter MacNicol, actor, once lived at 95 Christopher Street
Marshall W. Mason, theater director, lived at 165 Christopher Street for 43 years
David "Fathead" Newman, jazz musician who lived at 95 Christopher through the 1980s
Yoko Ono, singer and artist, once lived at 87 Christopher Street
William Poole, member of the New York City gang Bowery Boys
Dawn Powell, author, lived at 95 Christopher Street from 1963 to 1965
Lindsay Price, actress 
Amy Sedaris, actress and comedian, once lived at 95 Christopher Street
Linda Solomon, New York editor of New Musical Express and Village Voice columnist lived at 95 Christopher from 1960 to 1999
Ted White, author and editor, once lived at 105 Christopher Street

In popular culture
"Christopher Street" is both a song and the main location of the 1953 musical Wonderful Town.
The courtyard of 125 Christopher Street was the model for the sets of the 1954 thriller film Rear Window, directed by Alfred Hitchcock.
The 1979 episode "The Spy" of the TV show Barney Miller -- about a group of New York City police detectives working in the fictional 12th Precinct in Greenwich Village -- established Miller's home address as 617 Christopher Street.
In Paul Simon's 1983 song "Rene and Georgette Magritte with Their Dog after the War," artist René Magritte and his wife Georgette "were strolling down Christopher Street when they stopped in a men's store."
The 1999 song "My My Metrocard", by queercore punk band Le Tigre on their debut album, mentions the location.
On the TV show NYPD Blue, season 7, episode 3 (June 2000) "The Man with Two Right Shoes" shows Christopher Street directly after detectives mention "hitting the fairy bars" to find a gay, male prostitute.
The Lou Reed song "Halloween Parade" from his 1989 album New York begins with the line "There's a downtown fairy singing out 'Proud Mary' as she cruises Christopher Street."
In the comic series "Preacher", it's referenced as the current address of detective Paul Bridges, implying that the tough, ruthless, and homophobic detective, was in fact homosexual.
The Clash song “Lightning Strikes (Not Once But Twice)” references Christopher Street with the lyrics, “A Polaroid caught in the act, you’re married too and that’s a fact, but I won’t peak and I won’t squeak down by the trucks on Christopher Street…”

References

External links

Gay/Lesbian nightlife on Christopher Street from GayCities New York
New York: Christopher Street, NYSonglines.com virtual walking tour

 
Streets in Manhattan
Stonewall National Monument